Vatroslav Bertić (7 June 1818 – 1901) was a Croatian mathematician.

Life

Bertić was born in Orehovica. His parents were Josip Jakov Bertić and noble Regina Antonija Gregoroczy (Gregurovečki). By his father's side he was of military background and by his mother's side he was connected with old Croatian nobility such as the Deželić and Gregurovečki families. He studied technical sciences in Budapest and was later employed by Croatian Ban Josip Jelačić in the military.

Bertić worked on the mathematical education and numeracy of the Croatian people. He coined a Croatian term for mathematics - oloslovlje. 

Bertić was married to Amalija Kaltneker with whom he had five children. He died in Hum Zabočki in 1901.

Work in logic

In 1847 Bertić wrote a book named Samouka – pokus pervi in which he offered a rudimentary algebraic language of “thoughts and concepts” (including variables, constants, equality sign) to which the law of substitution is added, which was the beginning stage of Boolean logic. Bertić made his research independent from George Boole.

References

External links
 Vatroslav Bertić 
 HRVATSKI MATEMATIČARI 
 Povijest hrvatske matematike - Hrvatski matematičari 

1818 births
1901 deaths
People from Međimurje County
Croatian mathematicians
Međimurje